Sangeet Bhojpuri (Bhojpuri: संगीत भोजपुरी) is India's first Bhojpuri television channel that plays non-stop music. The channel is a part of the Media Worldwide Limited - an Indian Television broadcaster that also owns three other music channels - Music India, Sangeet Bangla and Sangeet Marathi.
Sangeet Bhojpuri Channel is not available on TATA Sky.

History 
Sangeet Bhojpuri was launched on 14 July 2008 and is based in Mumbai.

About 
The channel plays a mix of different genres of music all throughout the day ranging from peppy dance numbers, to item songs and romantic numbers. The channel also has a program that plays compiled mix of devotional songs and broadcasts latest hit movies for Bhojpuri cinema followers.

Sangeet Bhojpuri Channel is not available on TATA Sky

Sangeet Bhojpuri is broadcast across the Indian sub-continent and it reaches to an approximate 24 million households across India.

Former programming 
Lathmaar was an interactive audience based show. The show was anchored by a character named Lathmaar who sat by the tea stall with a lathi (wooden stick in Hindi) in his hand and a gamcha (scarf) around his neck. Laathmaar carried a typical North Indian (Bhaiya) look and interacted with the audience in a comical manner. The character often boasted about himself and commented on the happenings of the Bhojpuri film industry. He played hit Bhojpuri tracks for the audience to revel in.

Lathmaar also interviewed many popular Bhojpuri film artists, directors, producers and other Bhojpuri celebs every Saturday. The audience could send song requests and dedicate songs to their loved ones. The viewers could also ask about their favourite Bhojpuri celebs or send in messages for the celebs and Lathmaar would respond to them.

Bhavishyabaani: It was an astrology program where the audience could seek probable astrological solutions to problems related to their Career, Business, Money, Love, Education, Property and Personal Matters. The show was hosted by Acharya Lakhan S. Bhardwaj, a renowned Astrologer, who has been a practicing Astrologer for more than sixteen years. R.R Mishra also used to write daily forecast and predictions for Free Press Journal.

See also
List of Bhojpuri-language television channels

References

External links 
Official Website

Hindi-language television channels in India
Music television channels in India
Television channels and stations established in 2015
Hindi-language television stations
Television stations in New Delhi
2015 establishments in India